Henrik Sandberg (15 May 1915 – 19 March 1993) was a Danish film producer. He produced 39 films between 1955 and 1979. He was born in Copenhagen, Denmark. His father was the Danish film director A. W. Sandberg.

Filmography

 Charly & Steffen (1979)
 Alt på et bræt (1977)
 Piger i trøjen 2 (1976)
 Piger i trøjen (1975)
 Takt og tone i himmelsengen (1972)
 Guld til præriens skrappe drenge (1971)
 Hvor er liget, Møller? (1971)
 Præriens skrappe drenge (1970)
 Amour (1970)
 Stille dage i Clichy (1970)
 Pigen fra Egborg (1969)
 Mej och dej (1969)
 Dyrlægens plejebørn (1968)
 Soldaterkammerater på bjørnetjeneste (1968)
 Onkel Joakims hemmelighed (1967)
 Cirkusrevyen 67 (1967)
 Elsk... din næste! (1967)
 Jeg - en marki (1967)
 Pigen og greven (1966)
 Der var engang (1966)
 Pigen og millionæren (1965)
 Flådens friske fyre (1965)
 Livgarden i rød galla (1965)
 Hit House (1965)
 Sommer i Tyrol (1964)
 Majorens oppasser (1964)
 Et døgn uden løgn (1963)
 Pigen og pressefotografen (1963)
 Soldaterkammerater på sjov (1962)
 Den rige enke (1962)
 Soldaterkammerater på efterårsmanøvre (1961)
 Sorte Shara (1961)
 To skøre ho'der (1961)
 Soldaterkammerater på vagt (1960)
 Soldaterkammerater rykker ud (1959)
 Soldaterkammerater (1958)
 Vi som går stjernevejen (1956)
 Tre finder en kro (1955)
 Jorden rundt paa 80 minutter (1955)

External links

1915 births
1993 deaths
Danish film producers
People from Copenhagen